Noel Spencer (born 26 July 1977 in Wollongong, Australia) is a former Australian football (soccer) player who coaches Dapto Dandaloo Fury in the Illawarra Premier League.

Club career

NSL
Noel played for his hometown of Wollongong from 1996 to 2000 and was part of Wollongong Wolves championship-winning team of the 1999/2000 season. After the championship win Noel left for Northern Spirit which he played for and later captained until the NSL became defunct. During the period between the end of the NSL competition and the beginning of the A-League he played a season for Parramatta Eagles.

Central Coast Mariners

Noel was the first captain of the Mariners, and took his team to the inaugural Hyundai A-League Grand Final, narrowly missing out on the honour of being the first captain to win the trophy. He scored on the opening day of the inaugural A-League season, away from home against Perth Glory, with a 30-yard drive from distance into the top right hand corner of the net. This goal was awarded the "Jesters' Pies Marinators' Goal of the Year" award at the end of the season. During the A-League 05-06 season he scored 6 goals and started in every single game for the Mariners. This record continued until Sunday 12 November when he was dropped because of injury which from the starting team against the Newcastle Jets. On Friday 26 January 2007 he along with Vuko Tomasevic and Wayne O'Sullivan were told that their contracts would not be renewed for the next season.

Sydney FC
After being released by the Mariners, Noel signed a six-month contract with Sydney FC. He played for Sydney in the 2007 AFC Champions League.

Newcastle United Jets
In May 2007 Noel Spencer signed a 2-year deal with the Newcastle United Jets as a replacement for Tim Brown. He made his A-League debut for the Jets when he came on as a substitute against Perth Glory on 26 August 2007. After the 2008-2009 A-league season he announced his retirement from professional football due injury.

Dapto Dandaloo Fury
In 2009, following being released by the Jets, he signed for Dapto Dandaloo Fury FC in the semi-professional Illawarra Premier League, helping the club win silverware in 2009, 2011, and 2012. In his final season at the club, Noel was promoted to Player-coach, and led the team to the season Premiership, and Grand Final win over Bulli FC.

Honours

Club
Central Coast Mariners
 A-League Pre-Season Challenge Cup: 2005

Newcastle Jets
A-League Championship: 2007-2008

Wollongong Wolves
NSL Championship: 1999-2000

Dapto Dandaloo Fury
Illawarra Premier League Champions: 2009, 2011, 2012, 2014

References

External links
 Oz Football profile

1977 births
Living people
Sportspeople from Wollongong
Australian soccer players
A-League Men players
Northern Spirit FC players
Central Coast Mariners FC players
Newcastle Jets FC players
Sydney FC players
Parramatta FC players
Association football midfielders